The miller moth may refer to:

 Miller (moth), Acronicta leporina, a species of the Noctuidae family
 Army cutworm, Euxoa auxiliaris, a species of the Noctuidae family
 Several species of the Cossidae family

Animal common name disambiguation pages